Su. Samuthiram (1941 – 1 April 2003),  was a Tamil writer from Tamil Nadu, India.

Biography
Samuthiram was born in Tippanampatti village in Tirunelveli District. He worked in All India Radio and Doordarshan. He was a prolific writer who wrote fourteen novels, four novellas, two essay anthologies, one play and more than 300 short stories (published as twenty two collections). Many of his works have been translated into other Indian languages like Telugu, Hindi and Malayalam. His political orientation was socialist and he was involved in many literary feuds with his fellow writers like Asokamitran and Vannanilavan. His works reflect his socialist beliefs and most of them are about the oppression of the downtrodden. In 1990, he was awarded the Sahitya Akademi Award for Tamil for his novel Veril Pazhutha Pala (lit. The Jack Fruit that ripened at the root). He died in 2003 in a road accident in Chennai.

Awards
Sahitya Akademi Award for Tamil (1990)
Tamil Annai award from Tamil University, Thanjavur
Ilakkiyachinthanai Short Story prize.
Kalaignar Award from Murasoli Trust (posthumous)

Partial bibliography

Novels
Veril pazhutha pala
Vaada malli
Palai pura
Oorukkul oru puratchi
Oru Kottukku VeLiyae
Kagidha Uravugal
Mann Sumai
Thalai Paagai
Velichathai nokki
Valarppu magal
Sathiyathukku kattupattal
Tharaasu
Sathiya avesam
Illam thorum idayangal
Nizhal mukangal
Moottam
Oththai Veedu
Puthai Manal
Chotru Pattaalam
Uyarathin Thaazhvukal

References

External links
Su. Samuthiram's works at Chennai Library

1941 births
2003 deaths
20th-century Indian novelists
Recipients of the Sahitya Akademi Award in Tamil
Tamil writers
Indian Tamil people
People from Tirunelveli district
Novelists from Tamil Nadu